Connacht Irish is the dialect of the Irish language spoken in the province of Connacht. Gaeltacht regions in Connacht are found in Counties Mayo (notably Tourmakeady, Achill Island and Erris) and Galway (notably in parts of Connemara and on the Aran Islands). Connacht Irish is also spoken in the Meath Gealtacht Ráth Chairn and Bailie Ghib. The dialects of Irish in Connacht are extremely diverse, with the pronunciation, forms and lexicon being different even within each county. 

The Irish of South Connemara is often considered the "standard" Connacht Irish owing to the number of speakers however it is unique within Connacht and has a lot more idiomatic connection to extinct dialects in North Clare (for example "acab" instead of "acu" in the rest of Connacht). Lexical and pronunciation differences exist within Mayo with Tourmakeady featuring an "í" sound in vowel endings much more commonly. In addition to this the lexicon of Dún Chaocháin to the east of Belmullet tends to be far more Ulster influenced than that of Eachléim ( vs ) and there is a huge Ulster influence on the dialect of North Mayo in general owing to historic migration. The Irish of Eachréidh na Gaillimhe and Dúiche Sheoigheach tend to share more phonetic commonalities with neighbouring Mayo than with South Connemara

Documented sub-dialects include those of Cois Fharraige and Conamara Theas, both of which are in Galway, and Erris in Mayo.

Lexicon
Some differences between Mayo and Galway are seen in the lexicon:

Some words used in Connacht Irish that aren't found in other dialects include:

Variant spellings include:

Variants distinctive of, but not unique to Connacht include:
, "potato", "potatoes"
, "whiskey"
, emphatic form  for the first person plural pronoun, Ulster Irish uses this form as well, whereas Munster Irish uses  although  are used in Mayo, particularly in the Erris dialect.
, "every" (contraction of gach + uile)

Phonology
The phonemic inventory of Connacht Irish (based on the accent of Tourmakeady in Mayo) is as shown in the following chart (see International Phonetic Alphabet for an explanation of the symbols). Symbols appearing in the upper half of each row are velarized (traditionally called "broad" consonants) while those in the bottom half are palatalized ("slender"). The consonant  is neither broad nor slender.

The vowels of Connacht Irish are as shown on the following chart. These positions are only approximate, as vowels are strongly influenced by the palatalization and velarization of surrounding consonants.

In addition, Connacht has the diphthongs .

Some characteristics of Connacht that distinguish it from the other dialects are:

 In some varieties, vowel lengthening before word-internal clusters of voiced plosive + liquid (e.g.   "church")
 In the variety spoken in Cois Fharraige (the area along the north shore of Galway Bay between Barna and Casla), underlying short  is realized as a long front  while underlying long  is realized as a back .
This happens in Ulster as well.
 Broad  is rendered  even in initial positions, with a few exceptions.
 The preposition-article compound  (i + an "in the") causes eclipsis, where it causes lenition in the Caighdeán and in the other dialects.

Morphology

Nouns
It is also common in many Gaelic-speaking areas of Connemara that the dative singular form of all 2nd declension nouns has been generally adopted as the nominative, giving these nouns the typical ending in palatalized consonants in the nominative singular. This is indicated in the spelling by the letter i before the final consonant.

Verbs

Irish verbs are characterized by having a mixture of analytic/an fhoirm scartha forms (where information about person and number is provided by a pronoun) and synthetic/an fhoirm tháite forms (where this information is provided in an ending on the verb) in their conjugation. In Galway and Mayo, as in Ulster, the analytic forms are used in a variety of forms where the standard language has synthetic forms, e.g.  "we praise" (standard ) or  "they would praise" (standard ). However, the synthetic forms, including those no longer included in the standard language, may be used in answering questions.

Notable speakers

Some notable Irish singers who sing songs in the Connacht Irish dialect include Seosamh Ó hÉanaí, MacDara O Conaola, Darach Ó Catháin, Seán Mac Donncha and Máire Áine Ní Dhonnchadha.

Notes

References

Bibliography

Literature

 [folklore about the sea and seaweed in Cois Fhairrge dialect]
 [short stories, Maigh Cuilinn]
 [short stories, Maigh Cuilinn]
 [folklore, Maigh Cuilinn]
 [short stories, Maigh Cuilinn]
 [novel, Maigh Cuilinn]
 [short stories, Maigh Cuilinn]
 [novel, Maigh Cuilinn]

 [storytelling of Tomás Laighléis, Mionlach]

 [autobiography]
 [short stories and journalism]
 [folklore, Connemara]
 [biography, Aran Islands]
 [collection of writings by Mícheál Breathnach, Cois Fhairrge]

 [local history, Connemara dialect]
 [stories, Northern Mayo dialect]
 [memoirs, Northern Mayo dialect]

 [Northern Mayo dialect]
 [folklore from the Aran Islands]

 [autobiography, Connemara dialect]

 [folklore, eastern Galway]
 [novel, Connemara dialect]
 [short stories, Connemara dialect]
 [short stories, Connemara dialect]
 [short stories, Connemara dialect]
 [short stories, Connemara dialect]
 [essays, journalism, history, politics, miscellany, Connemara dialect]
 [short stories, Connemara dialect]
 [novel, Connemara dialect]
 [journalism, Connemara dialect]
 [essays, Connemara dialect]
 [history, politics, Connemara dialect]
 [novel, Connemara dialect]
 [research and opinions, Connemara dialect & English]
 [short stories, Connemara dialect]
 [folklore, Achill Island dialect]
 [folklore, Northern Mayo dialect]
 [folklore, Northern Mayo dialect]
 [novel, Connemara dialect]
 [novel, Connemara dialect]
 [short stories, Connemara dialect]
 [folklore, Connemara dialect]
 [local history, Aran Islands dialect]

 [story, Aran Islands dialect]
 [story, Aran Islands dialect]
 [folklore, Aran Islands dialect]
 [short stories, Connemara dialect]

 [novel, Connemara dialect]
 [folklore, autobiography, Connemara dialect]
 [West Galway dialect]
 [folklore, Bearna/Na Forbacha dialect]
 [autobiography, Aran Islands dialect]
 [poetry, Aran Islands dialect]

 [novel, Tourmakeady dialect]
 [short stories, Connemara dialect]
 [short stories, Aran Islands dialect]
 [autobiography, Ros Muc dialect]
 [folklore, memoirs, autobiography, Connemara dialect]
 [autobiography, Connemara dialect]
 [novel, Aran Islands dialect]
 [novel, Aran Islands dialect]
 [journalism, Aran Islands dialect]
 [local history, Southern Mayo dialect]
 [lexicon, expressions, Connemara dialect]
 [history, Connemara dialect]

 [short stories, Connemara dialect]
 [novel, Connemara dialect]
 [novel, Connemara dialect]

 [novel, Connemara dialect]
 [novel, Connemara dialect]
 [novel, Connemara dialect]
 [Northern Mayo dialect]

 [memoirs and folklore, Ros Muc]

 [folklore, Achill Island dialect]

Music

External links

 Boston and the Irish Language: Fifty Years of Cultural Connection in Oral History
 Gaeilge Chonamara - An Ghaeilge mar a labhraítear i gConamara í
 Irish language in Mayo

Irish dialects
Connacht